The Japanese Elm cultivar Ulmus davidiana var. japonica 'Mitsui Centennial' is a cold-resistant selection raised at the Morden Experimental Station, Manitoba, Canada, in the 1970s .

Description
Similar in appearance to 'Jacan'. The species does not sucker from roots.

Pests and diseases
The tree is more resistant to Dutch elm disease than 'Jacan', and is also resistant to elm leaf beetle Xanthogaleruca luteola .

Cultivation
Largely restricted to Canada, 'Mitsui Centennial' is represented in Europe by a specimen at the Sir Harold Hillier Gardens in Hampshire, England, where it has grown strongly in a sheltered location on London Clay.

Accessions
North America
Dominion Arboretum, Ottawa, Ontario, Canada. No acc. details.
Europe
Grange Farm Arboretum, Sutton St James, Spalding, Lincolnshire, UK. Acc. no. not known.
Sir Harold Hillier Gardens, Romsey, Hampshire, UK. Acc. no. 1981.0134

References

Japanese elm cultivar
Ulmus articles missing images
Ulmus